Veronika Gotseva (born 29 May 1993) is a Bulgarian footballer who plays as a forward for the Bulgaria women's national team.

International career
Gotseva capped most recently for Bulgaria at senior level in a 0–6 friendly loss to Croatia on 14 June 2019.

References

1993 births
Living people
Women's association football forwards
Bulgarian women's footballers
Bulgaria women's international footballers
Bulgarian expatriate footballers
Bulgarian expatriate sportspeople in North Macedonia
Expatriate footballers in North Macedonia